ODDO BHF is an independent Franco-German financial services group. It was created from the alliance of a French family-owned business built up by five generations of stockbrokers and a German bank specialising in Mittelstand companies. With 2,300 employees (1,300 in Germany and 1,000 in France), and more than 100 billion euros in assets under management, ODDO BHF operates in three main businesses, based on significant investment in market expertise: private banking, asset management and corporate and investment banking.

History of BHF Bank
The bank was formed on 1 January 1970 as the Berliner Handels- und Frankfurter Bank from the merger of the Frankfurter Bank (founded in 1854) and the Berliner Handels-Gesellschaft (founded in 1856). In 1970, when the BHF-Bank tower was built by the German architect Sep Ruf, it was the highest building in Frankfurt. The banks changed its name to BHF-Bank in 1975. Through the 1970s and 1980s it was in the top three to five investment banks in West Germany and had a top position in the foreign exchange market. The bank had extensive industrial holdings. Its former senior partner, Hanns Schroeder-Hohenwarth, became the President of the German Banks Association from 1983 to 1987.

In 1995 the bank went public, changing from a partnership to a corporation. From 1999 to 2004 it was bought by the Dutch ING Group and renamed from 2002 ING BHF-Bank. In the same year it was delisted following the squeeze out of remaining share holders.

In 2004 ING BHF-Bank was split. The majority of the bank's business operations, offices and equity shareholdings were integrated into the newly founded BHF-BANK Aktiengesellschaft, which was then acquired by the private bank Sal. Oppenheim as its sole shareholder. When Sal. Oppenheim was taken over by Deutsche Bank in 2010, BHF-BANK, which has always operated on a stand-alone basis, was put up for sale.

In 2014, the bank has formed part of BHF Kleinwort Benson Group, which was taken over by the French private bank Oddo et Cie. By mid-March 2016, Oddo et Cie had acquired 100% of BHF Kleinwort Benson Group's shares, and has thus become BHF-BANK's indirect sole shareholder. In April 2017, the company was renamed ODDO BHF Aktiengesellschaft.

History of ODDO BHF 
Oddo & Cie was founded in 1967 by Bernard Oddo, stockbroker in Marseille (France).

1980 – 1989
In 1987, Philippe Oddo becomes managing partner of the Group.

It is in 1988 that AGF Group enters the capital of the company, becoming a minority shareholder.

1990 – 1999
In 1991, Oddo et Cie opens its Oddo DV subsidiary in Madrid.

In 1997, the company acquires Delahaye Finance, which is specialized in private management. 1998 marks the Group's establishment in the United States, with the launch of Oddo Securities Corporation in New York City. In the same year, Oddo Options is launched, aiming to gather all the options trading activities in Paris, Madrid and Milan.

In 1999, Oddo Asset Management is created, strengthening the Group's position in institutional management.

2000 – 2009
The 2000s were marked by several acquisitions from Oddo et Cie. In 2000, the Group acquires Pinatton, a company specialized in intermediation, corporate finance and private banking. In 2003, Oddo et Cie acquires NFMDA (private management), and the European credit intermediation activities of Crédit Lyonnais in 2004. In 2005, Oddo et Cie buys Cyril Finance Asset Management, and KilbraXE in 2007.

In the same year, the Group obtains the status of bank.

In 2006, the Group launches its new branch Oddo Metals, for metal trading.

Concurrently with these acquisitions, Oddo et Cie strengthens its activities through different partnerships with the sector's major players. In 2003, the Group launches Génération Vie, joint venture with Allianz. La Banque postale Private Banking is launched in 2007 in partnership with La Banque Postale, to expand the Group's private clientele.

In 2009, the Group launches Oddo Research Institute in Tunis.

2010 – 2021
In 2010, a commercial agreement is signed by Oddo Services and Société Générale Securities Services (SGSS) to develop a joint offering of securities services.

Since 2010, the Group has made new acquisitions, such as the Banque d'Orsay from the German WestLB (2010), the Banque Robeco from the Robeco Group (2010), ODDO SEYDLER BANK AG, now renamed to ODDO BHF Corporates & Markets AG (market activities) from English Closer Brothers Group (2014), Meriten IM (asset management) from BNY Mellon (2015). In 2010, rises to 65% in the capital of Patrimoine Consultant, becoming the society's majority shareholder. Finally, in 2016, Oddo et Cie acquires BHF Bank, which became ODDO BHF the following year.

Branches 
ODDO BHF has its offices in different locations in France, Germany and worldwide:

 In France : Paris (private bank, investment banking, asset management), Lyon (Mid Caps shares, private bank), Strasbourg (private bank), Bordeaux (private bank) and Marseille (private bank).
 In Germany : Frankfurt (private bank, investment banking, asset management), Mainz (private bank), Berlin (private bank), Munich (private bank), Cologne (private bank), Baden-Baden (private bank), Hamburg (private bank), Nuremberg (private bank), Düsseldorf (private bank, asset management), Hannover (private bank), Essen (private bank), Stuttgart (private bank), Münster (private bank).
 Worldwide : Abu Dhabi (private bank), Dubai (Europe equities, asset management), Geneva (asset management, private bank), Ho Chi Minh City (private bank), Hong Kong (investment banking), Luxembourg (account keeping, custody), Milan (asset management), Madrid (asset management), Stockholm (asset management), Tunis (research), Zurich (private bank).

References 

Article contains translated text from Oddo et Cie on the French Wikipedia retrieved on 10 March 2017.

External links 
 ODDO BHF

Banks of France
Banks established in 1849
French companies established in 1849
Companies formerly in the MDAX